Tomás Giménez Behr (born 29 October 1998) is an Argentine professional footballer who plays as a goalkeeper for Gimnasia y Esgrima.

Club career
Giménez was promoted into Gimnasia y Esgrima's first-team squad during the 2018–19 Primera B Nacional campaign, with the goalkeeper initially being an unused substitute thirteen times; as well as twice in the Copa Argentina. His professional debut arrived on 6 May 2019 in a 1–1 home draw with Almagro in the promotion play-offs, as he came off the substitutes bench in place of Tomás Marchiori at the interval.

International career
In March 2017, Giménez was called up by Claudio Úbeda's Argentina U20s to train in preparation for that year's FIFA U-20 World Cup.

Career statistics
.

References

External links

1998 births
Living people
Sportspeople from Mendoza, Argentina
Argentine footballers
Association football goalkeepers
Primera Nacional players
Gimnasia y Esgrima de Mendoza footballers